The Makati Intra-city Subway or (MkTr) is an under-construction underground rapid transit line to be located in Makati, Metro Manila, that will link establishments across the city's business district. It will be built under a public-private partnership program between the Makati City Government and a private consortium, led by Philippine Infradev Holdings. Proponents of the subway are expected to begin construction by December 2018, and Makati Mayor Abigail Binay projects completion by 2025. The subway will cost $2.5 billion (or ) and is expected to accommodate 700,000 passengers daily. It will also have nine stations, with connections to the existing MRT Line 3, Pasig River Ferry Service, and the under-construction Metro Manila Subway.

Route
The original terminus was supposed to be at the Ayala station with connectivity to the existing MRT Line 3, but was shelved in favor of the new location at the Mile Long Property along Amorsolo Street.

History

Early planning

Preparatory work officially began on December 12, 2018, following a ceremonial drilling ceremony at the front of the Makati City Hall, which is near the site of one of the proposed stations of the subway. The signing of the memorandum of understanding between the Makati city government and a consortium consisting of Philippine Infradev and Chinese firms Greenland Holdings Group, Jiangsu Provincial Construction Group Co. Ltd., Holdings Ltd. and China Harbour Engineering Company Ltd was also held on the same day. Preparatory work included soil testing and feasibility studies of the proposed locations for the subway line's stations.

As of June 2019, 8 out of the 10 proposed stations have been finalized. The two proposed stations along Ayala Avenue are yet to be finalized due to "non-response" from its owners. The proponents have stated that they may divert the subway towards the Philippine National Railways Buendia station or the Mile Long property in Legazpi Village instead. In the interim, the first station would be in the current location of the Makati Central Fire Station, which will be demolished, then towards a Lucio Tan owned property near Circuit Makati, and Makati City Hall. The remaining stations would be located near Century City, Rockwell Center, Guadalupe Bliss Housing in Cembo, BGC-Ortigas Link Bridge, University of Makati and the final station in the vicinity of Ospital ng Makati.

In July 2019, soil testing related to the subway completed as the Philippine Infradev and Makati LGU has signed a joint venture agreement for the project

As of October 2019, the plan to move the terminus of the line to the Mile Long property being redeveloped by the national government along Amorsolo Street has been finalized. Favorable soil test results and the route diversion meant that the cost of the project might go down to as low as $2.5 billion.

A joint venture with Megaworld Corp. was formed to build a common station located in Guadalupe for the subway system and for the planned SkyTrain. In a disclosure to the stock exchange, the Philippine Infradev wholly owned subsidiary, Makati City Subway Inc. (MCSI) has received the term sheet from Megaworld. The joint venture will build access and connections to the MRT Guadalupe Station and the Pasig River Ferry.

Construction
Philippine Infradev Holdings, Inc. received an Environmental Compliance Certificate (ECC) from the Department of Environment and Natural Resources (DENR) and is looking to commence works before the year 2020. If pushed through, the subway may be completed in 2024, a year ahead of schedule.

On July 20, 2020, the EPC contract was signed and awarded to China Construction Second Engineering Bureau Ltd. (CCSEB) and Shanghai Electric Automation Group for the subway line's construction. Former Philippine Vice President Jejomar Binay and Makati Mayor Abigail Binay delivered their speeches via video conference as gratitude for the project. On July 23, 2020, the right-of-way acquisition has commenced for the project, of which 55 landowners received a total of ₱1,000,000 (US$20,270) as compensation. The affected landowners will receive a total compensation of ₱1.18 billion (US$23.9 million).

On August 18, 2020, groundbreaking for the Station 3's transit-oriented development took place, where former parking lots and transport terminal used to stand. To recall, Philippine Infradev executed an agreement with China Construction First Group Corp. Ltd. (CCFG) to build the Station 3's transit-oriented development. Construction will last for 42 months.

Acquisition of properties is also underway in the vicinity of Makati City Hall, as several homes and structures were closed and demolished. The vicinity, also known as Station 5, has been identified as the project's main construction site, where the tunnel boring machine will be assembled and lowered. On October 25, 2020, a city ordinance was enacted to approve and hasten the Right-of-Way acquisition.

On May 14, 2021, the first of five tunnel boring machine was received by the Philippine Infradev Chairman Ren Jinhua in Shanghai, China from its manufacturer in a simple ceremony. It will arrive in the country once the Station 5 construction site was demolished and cleared up.

On November 8, 2021, the Fiscal Incentives Review Board (FIRB) has approved the grant of tax incentives for the rail operations of an  subway project in Makati City that is expected to begin commercial operations in January 2026.

A majority of the five-member FIRB chaired by Finance Secretary Carlos Dominguez III approved last month the grant of four years of income tax holiday, followed by 5 years of enhanced deductions and duty exemption on importation for the construction, operation, management, and maintenance of the rail project.

Fares and ticketing 
The upcoming line will use a distance-based fare structure and will be charged 20% to 25% higher than the fares of LRT Line 1 and MRT Line 3. A 25 percent premium will bring the subway's rate to about ₱38 (69 U.S. cents) for 10 stops.

Infrastructure

Station layout 
All stations will have a standard layout, with a concourse level and a platform level. The stations are designed to be barrier-free. All stations will have island platforms with full-height platform screen doors.

Rolling stock 
The line will operate electric multiple units in a 6-car configuration, with a headway of three minutes.

Expansion
In the aftermath of the 2019 elections, Antonio Tiu, President of Philippine Infradev has stated that he is open to initiating and entering a similar partnership deal with Makati's neighboring cities for the expansion of the subway system. The cities of Manila, Mandaluyong, San Juan, Pasay, and Pasig were specifically mentioned by Tiu.

With the finalized move of the terminus to the Mile Long property, a  complex along Amorsolo Street, Tiu has started negotiations with the Calixto siblings, Mayor Emi and Congressman Tony, of Pasay to extend the line up to Ninoy Aquino International Airport, which is only three kilometers away from Mile Long and is slated for redevelopment.

References 

Makati
Metro Manila
Rapid transit lines
Proposed public transportation in the Philippines
Rail transportation in Metro Manila
2025 in rail transport